Irish Medicines Formulary (IMF)  is a medicines reference for doctors, nurses, pharmacists and dentists, providing medicines information which is medico-legally relevant in Ireland. It is published in online and print formats, and lists original brands, branded generics and pure generic prescription medicines.

Together with pricing and prescribing information, IMF also includes Irish-specific administrative information, drug interaction and dosing details.

The book is published bi-annually, and is released in paperback by Meridian Ireland, and is also available online as IMF-Online.

Edition 32 of the publication (IMF 32) was published in March 2023, and IMF-Online was updated with the same content.

See also
 British National Formulary (BNF)
 Health Products Regulatory Authority (HPRA)
 MIMS Ireland

References

External links
 

Reference works in medicine
Medicine in the Republic of Ireland
Irish non-fiction books